Joseph Woll (born July 12, 1998) is an American professional ice hockey goaltender for the Toronto Marlies of the American Hockey League (AHL) as a prospect to the Toronto Maple Leafs of the National Hockey League (NHL). Woll was selected by the Maple Leafs in the third round (62nd overall) of the 2016 NHL Entry Draft.

Playing career
Woll played three years of college hockey with Boston College. Woll modeled his style of play on Carey Price. He assumed the team's starting role in net after Thatcher Demko graduated. He played in the 2017 World Junior Championships for Team USA. He appeared in two games, posting a 1.50 goals against average (GAA) and .932 save percentage and won a gold medal with the team. He played in the 2018 World Junior Championships with Team USA. He started five games on the way to winning the bronze medal that year.

Woll was selected by the Toronto Maple Leafs in the third round (62nd overall) of the 2016 NHL Entry Draft. He signed a three-year entry level contract with the Maple Leafs on March 24, 2019. In July 2021, he signed a one-year contract extension with the Maple Leafs. 

He was recalled by the Maple Leafs on November 6, 2021 after Petr Mrázek suffered an injury. Woll made his NHL debut on November 13, 2021, against the Buffalo Sabres and made 23 saves in a 5–4 win. He played in four games total with the Maple Leafs and went 3–1–0 with a 2.76 GAA and a .911 save percentage. On February 11, 2022, he signed a three-year extension with the Maple Leafs.

Career statistics

Regular season and playoffs

International

References

External links
 

1998 births
Living people
American men's ice hockey goaltenders
Boston College Eagles men's ice hockey players
Ice hockey people from Missouri
Toronto Maple Leafs draft picks
Toronto Maple Leafs players
Toronto Marlies players